Architectonica gualtierii is a species of sea snail, a marine gastropod mollusk in the family Architectonicidae, which are known as the staircase shells or sundials.

Description
Architectonica gualtierii has a shell that reaches 61 mm.

Distribution
This species can be found in the Indo-Pacific, from East Africa via Japan, the Philippines and Vietnam to eastern Australia.

References

Architectonicidae
Gastropods described in 1993